The following radio stations broadcast on FM frequency 103.9 MHz:

Albania
 BBC World Service in Tirana

Argentina
 LRI319 del Rosario in Rosario, Santa Fe
 Radio María in Sauce, Corrientes

Australia
 ABC Classic FM in Adelaide, South Australia
 Good News Radio in Ballarat, Victoria
 3GCB in Latrobe Valley
 3SEY Seymour, Central Victoria

Canada (Channel 280)
 CBAF-FM-13 in Chéticamp, Nova Scotia
 CBBP-FM in Peterborough, Ontario
 CBRQ-FM in Lake Louise, Alberta (formerly VF2105)
 CBRF-FM in Calgary, Alberta
 CBTM-FM in Masset, British Columbia
 CFCK-FM in Canoe Lake, Saskatchewan
 CFFD-FM in Laforge-2, Quebec
 CFIN-FM-1 in Armagh, Quebec
 CFJH-FM in Burns Lake, British Columbia
 CFQM-FM in Moncton, New Brunswick
 CHNO-FM in Sudbury, Ontario
 CHOA-FM-2 in La Sarre, Quebec
 CHOK-1-FM in Sarnia, Ontario
 CHVO-FM in Carbonear, Newfoundland and Labrador
 CIFM-FM-3 in Merritt, British Columbia
 CIME-FM in St-Jerome, Quebec
 CIMS-FM in Campbellton, New Brunswick
 CIRR-FM in Toronto, Ontario
 CISN-FM in Edmonton, Alberta
 CJAW-FM in Moose Jaw, Saskatchewan
 CJBC-FM-1 in Windsor, Ontario
 CKOV-FM in Kelowna, British Columbia
 CKDK-FM in Woodstock, Ontario
 CKWE-FM in Maniwaki, Quebec
 CKXX-FM in Corner Brook, Newfoundland and Labrador
 VF2015 in Chetwynd, British Columbia
 VF2103 in Fort St. James, British Columbia
 VF2155 in Poste Laverendrye, Quebec
 VF2294 in Rainbow Lake, Alberta
 VF2371 in Kemess Mine Site, British Columbia
 VF2377 in Campbell Road, British Columbia

China 
 Beijing Traffic Radio in Beijing
 CNR Music Radio in Yuxi
 CNR The Voice of China in Daqing and Shaoxing
 CRI News Radio in Changsha (stopped airing in 2016)

Colombia
La X (HJG54) in Medellín, Antioquía 
La X (HJVU) in Bogotá, Cundinamarca

Mexico
 XHCA-FM in El Barrio Lagunas, Oaxaca
 XHCPAQ-FM in Lerdo, Durango
 XHCSBW-FM in Jalpan de Serra, Querétaro
XHDQ-FM in San Andrés Tuxtla, Veracruz
 XHESC-FM in Escárcega, Campeche
 XHESOL-FM in El Jaral (Cd. Hidalgo), Michoacán
 XHEWA-FM in San Luis Potosí, San Luis Potosí
 XHEZM-FM in Zamora, Michoacán
 XHLD-FM in Autlán de Navarro, Jalisco
 XHMTS-FM in Tampico, Tamaulipas
 XHPEC-FM in San Bartolo Tutotepec, Hidalgo
 XHPJAL-FM in Jalpa, Zacatecas
 XHPO-FM in Acapulco, Guerrero
 XHRF-FM in Ciudad Acuña, Coahuila
 XHRUY-FM in Mérida, Yucatán
 XHSFJ-FM in San Felipe Jalapa de Díaz, Oaxaca
 XHURS-FM in Ures, Sonora
 XHVF-FM in Villaflores, Chiapas

Philippines
DWHB in Baguio City
DWAR-FM in Puerto Princesa City
DWOP in Naga City
DXFO in Cagayan de Oro City
DXLK in General Santos City
DXAP in Butuan City

United Kingdom
 BBC Radio Cornwall (Redruth)

United States (Channel 280)
 KAAJ-LP in Monticello, Utah
 KBAV-LP in Coos Bay, Oregon
 KBBD in Spokane, Washington
  in Taft, California
 KBGZ in Spring Creek, Nevada
  in Osakis, Minnesota
 KBQQ in Smiley, Texas
 KCNU in Silver City, Idaho
 KCXX in Comanche, Texas
 KDFG in Seaside, California
 KDJK in Mariposa, California
 KDKI-LP in Twin Falls, Idaho
 KDOC-FM in Eyota, Minnesota
 KFFI-LP in Boise, Idaho
  in Edwards, California
  in Gillette, Wyoming
  in Smithfield, Utah
  in Las Cruces, New Mexico
 KHGA in Earle, Arkansas
 KHTI in Lake Arrowhead, California
  in Copeland, Kansas
 KIDD in Fort Mohave, Arizona
  in Zapata, Texas
  in Lincoln, California
  in Fayetteville, Arkansas
 KLPH-LP in Alliance, Nebraska
  in Montgomery City, Missouri
  in Marshall, Texas
 KMIS-FM in Gideon, Missouri
 KMSM-FM in Butte, Montana
 KNLV-FM in Ord, Nebraska
 KNUQ in Paauilo, Hawaii
  in Hiawatha, Kansas
  in Fort Scott, Kansas
  in Pawhuska, Oklahoma
 KPGG in Ashdown, Arkansas
 KQHK in McCook, Nebraska
 KQXC-FM in Wichita Falls, Texas
 KRCD (FM) in Inglewood, California
 KRFS-FM in Superior, Nebraska
  in Plainview, Texas
 KRKA in Severance, Colorado
  in Malta Bend, Missouri
  in Pueblo West, Colorado
  in Snowmass Village, Colorado
 KSVM-LP in Walla Walla, Washington
  in Yreka, California
  in College, Alaska
 KTHP in Hemphill, Texas
 KTNX (FM) in Arcadia, Missouri
  in Spirit Lake, Iowa
 KVAS-FM in Ilwaco, Washington
 KVLX in Franklin, Texas
 KWGF in Vaughn, Montana
  in Garapan-Saipan, Northern Mariana Islands
  in Kalispell, Montana
 KZON in Gilbert, Arizona
 KZTK in Arthur, North Dakota
 WAIP-LP in Gulfport, Mississippi
  in Bellwood, Pennsylvania
 WANC in Ticonderoga, New York
 WAWY in Dundee, Illinois
 WBZX in Big Rapids, Michigan
 WCLD-FM in Cleveland, Mississippi
  in Harbor Springs, Michigan
 WCNM in Hazlet, New Jersey
 WCOP in Eldred, Pennsylvania
 WDBT in Fort Rucker, Alabama
  in Greensboro, Georgia
 WDEB-FM in Jamestown, Tennessee
  in Rochester, New York
 WDPT-LP in Panama City, Florida
 WEWZ-LP in Waycross, Georgia
 WFTP-LP in Fort Payne, Alabama
 WGLH in Hawkinsville, Georgia
 WGMF-FM in Laporte, Pennsylvania
 WHQV-LP in Hendersonville, Tennessee
 WHTU in Big Island, Virginia
 WHXT in Orangeburg, South Carolina
 WIAF-LP in Antioch, Tennessee
  in Crawfordsville, Indiana
 WJKR in Worthington, Ohio
 WJUP-LP in Jupiter, Florida
 WKHB-FM in Scottdale, Pennsylvania
 WKHV-LP in Kingston, New York
  in South Yarmouth, Massachusetts
 WLCV-LP in Ludington, Michigan
  in Adrian, Michigan
 WLFM in Lawrenceburg, Tennessee
 WLTD-LP in Dickson, Tennessee
  in Fuquay-Varina, North Carolina
 WNOA-LP in Marquette, Michigan
 WNOI in Flora, Illinois
 WNRJ in Vienna, West Virginia
 WOZO-LP in Knoxville, Tennessee
 WOZW-LP in Knoxville, Tennessee
 WPBZ-FM in Rensselaer, New York
  in Blue Ridge, Georgia
  in Jenkintown, Pennsylvania
 WQCY in Quincy, Illinois
 WQJZ-LP in Murfreesboro, Tennessee
  in Batesville, Indiana
 WRBR-FM in South Bend, Indiana
  in Riverhead, New York
 WRDE-FM in Berlin, Maryland
 WRFM in Drakesboro, Kentucky
 WRKA in Louisville, Kentucky
  in Owosso, Michigan
 WSEN in Mexico, New York
 WSHP-FM in Easley, South Carolina
  in Oneonta, New York
 WSWD-LP in Tifton, Georgia
  in Braddock Heights, Maryland
 WTPN in Westby, Wisconsin
 WTYB in Bluffton, South Carolina
 WVBN in Bronxville, New York
  in Winneconne, Wisconsin
 WVOM-FM in Howland, Maine
  in London, Kentucky
 WWEO-LP in DeFuniak Springs, Florida
 WWFW in Fort Wayne, Indiana
 WWIZ in West Middlesex, Pennsylvania
  in Okolona, Mississippi
 WWND-LP in White Stone, Virginia
 WXAN in Ava, Illinois
 WXIS in Erwin, Tennessee
 WXKB in Cape Coral, Florida
 WXKQ-FM in Whitesburg, Kentucky
 WXRD in Crown Point, Indiana
 WYAB in Pocahontas, Mississippi
 WYFT in Luray, Virginia
 WZDA in Beavercreek, Ohio

References

Lists of radio stations by frequency